The Jordan national under-17 football team is the national under-17 football team of Jordan and is controlled by the Jordan Football Association. The team also serves as the national under-16 and national under-15 football teams of Jordan.

While the team is yet to qualify for both the FIFA U-17 World Cup, they have played in the AFC U-17 Asian Cup three times, reaching the quarter-finals of the 2010 edition. They also participate in the WAFF U-16 Championship.

Competitive records

FIFA U-17 World Cup

AFC U-16 Championship/AFC U-17 Asian Cup

Arab U-17 and U-15 Championships
2009 Arab U-17 Championship: (3rd Place)
2011 Arab U-15 Championship: (Withdrew)
2012 Arab U-17 Championship: (Withdrew)

International Cups/Friendly Tournaments
2013 U-16 Caspian Cup
2014 IAST Friendly Cup (Winner)

Current Coaching Staff

Coaching History 
  Colwyn Rowe (2004-2006)
  Walid Fatafta (2009-2010)
  Jonathan William Hill (2010)  
  Bibert Kaghado (2011-2012)
  Adnan Awad (2013-)

Current squad 
The following U-17 players were called-up for the WAFF Championship in June 2019.

Kit Providers
Adidas (2004-2005) 
Jako (2006-2009) 
Uhlsport (2009-2010) 
Jako (2010-)

See also
 Jordan national football team
 Jordan national under-23 football team
 Jordan national under-20 football team 
 Jordan national under-14 football team
 Jordan women's national football team

References

External links
 
 

u17
Asian national under-17 association football teams